Cylichneulia telesocia is a species of moth of the family Tortricidae. It is found in Venezuela.

References

Moths described in 1994
Euliini
Moths of South America
Taxa named by Józef Razowski